The 2nd Secretariat of the Workers' Party of Vietnam (WPV), formally the 2nd Secretariat of the Central Committee of the Workers' Party of Vietnam (Vietnamese: Ban Bí thư Ban Chấp hành Trung ương Đảng Lao động Việt Nam Khoá II), was elected by the 1st Plenary Session of the 2nd Central Committee (CC) in the immediate aftermath of the 2nd National Congress.

Members

References

Bibliography
 

2nd Secretariat of the Workers' Party of Vietnam